The Edna Ryan Awards, also referred to as simply "The EDNAS", are Australian awards established to recognise women who have "made a feminist difference". The inaugural Edna Ryan Awards were held in 1998, the year following the death of Edna Ryan. Edna Ryan was a life-long feminist, labour movement activist, and mentor and role model for a whole generation of women. These awards were created to honour her life and work by a group of her friends, particularly Eva Cox and other members of the Women's Electoral Lobby (WEL).

Edna Ryan had been closely involved with WEL, particularly the Women in the Workforce group which she convened. WEL hosted and administered the EDNAS from 1998 -2010, but from 2012 they were administered by The Edna Ryan Awards Committee and hosted by the Australian Services Union (ASU).  In 2020 the Older Women's Network (OWN) NSW took over hosting the awards.

Nominees for the awards must be comfortable identifying as a feminist and must live or work in NSW or the ACT as Edna did during her lifetime. A panel reviews all nominations and the awards are presented on an annual basis at an evening social event. Since their inception the awards have recognised many high-profile Australian women for their feminist activity, including Eva Cox, Meredith Burgmann, Susan Ryan, Anne Summers, Wendy McCarthy, Jane Caro and Sally McManus. However, many of the recipients have been tireless advocates for women's rights who worked as community activists over a long period with very little other reward or recognition.

The award categories can vary but in recent years there have been awards in many fields including workforce, government, arts, community activism, media/communications, leadership, mentoring, sport and education. The awards are not intended as simply recognition of women who are successful in their own field, but require evidence that their achievements or actions have made a feminist difference by improving the lives and status of women within the community. There is also a Grand Stirrer award for inciting others to challenge the status quo.

Grand Stirrer Award Recipients

Award Recipients–by year (all categories)

2021

2018

2017

2016

2015

2014

2013

2012

2010

2009

2008

2007

2006

2005

2004

2003

2002

2001

2000

1999

1998

References

External links
 Edna Ryan Awards website

Australian awards
Awards established in 1998
1998 establishments in Australia
Awards honoring women